The Buynovska is a river of Plovdiv Province, Bulgaria. It is one of the source rivers of the Vacha and is joined by the Trigrad Gorge.

References

Rivers of Bulgaria
Landforms of Plovdiv Province